Jönköpings Södra IF, also known as J-Södra IF, J-Södra or simply Jönköping, is a Swedish football club based in Jönköping. The club, founded in 1922, returned to the Swedish second division Superettan in 2018 after relegation from the 2017 Allsvenskan. J-Södra has played a total of twelve Allsvenskan seasons previously, with the most successful finish being runner-up in 1950 and their last spell ending in 2017. The club is affiliated to the Smålands Fotbollförbund. They are currently (2023) playing in Superettan.

Jsödra is a 51% member-controlled club, due to Swedish law regarding the 50+1% Member-controlled rule.

Their home games are played at Stadsparksvallen with a capacity of 7300. The club's training facility is located in Odensberg in Jönköping, aswell at Junevallen and Jordbrovallen.

History

Jönköpings Södra IF was founded on 9 December 1922 with Bandy being the first sport where the club fielded a team. Other sports that were played by the club in its early days includes Boxing, Ice hockey, Tennis and Table tennis. In 1923 they played their first football match, which only featured eight players for each side as they did not have access to a big enough pitch to fit more players. Five years later J-Södra finally entered into league play for the first time as well as the district championship.

The club's first major success came during the 44–45 season. It was only their second year ever in the second tier of the Swedish football league system, but J-Södra managed to go through the season winning all 18 league games as well as the promotion playoffs, thus qualifying themselves for the top division Allsvenskan for the first time ever. Even though they were relegated the following season they immediately bounced back up to Allsvenskan again and the golden age of the club began as they established themselves in the top division throughout the late 1940s and early 1950s. With the culmination being the second-place finish in the 1949–50 Allsvenskan behind a dominant Malmö FF.

After their relegation in 1954 J-södra only managed two short one year appearances in Allsvenskan during the sixties. They instead became established in the second tier until the late 1980s when the club started plummeting down the divisions and eventually bottoming out in 1996 when they finished in 8th place in the fifth tier of Swedish football. In 2003 the club had returned to the third tier and at the start of the season they announced the high-profile signing of former Sweden national football team coach Olle Nordin as their new manager. During his reign he helped the club advance to, and establish themselves in, Superettan and he eventually also took over the role of director of sports. The 2014 Superettan season started in chaos as manager Mats Gren abruptly left to work for IFK Göteborg. After feeling unhappy with the list of managers that the board was considering the player squad declared that they wanted inexperienced youth coach Jimmy Thelin as their new manager. The board accepted the players proposal and during his second year in charge Thelin won promotion back to Allsvenskan with the club.

After the relegation from Allsvenskan, the club has established itself as a stable club in the Superettan.

Players

Managers

 Gunnar Gren (1941–42)
 Birger Möller (1942–43)
 Sölve Flisberg (1944)
 Eigil Nielsen (1945)
 Otto Cinadler (1945)
 Knut Holmgren (1946–48)
 Gerhard Thorsell (1949–51)
 Josef Stroh (1951–53)
 Gerhard Thorsell (1953–59)
 Olle Eriksson (1960)
 Vilém Lugr (1961–62)
 Per-Olof Johansson (1963–64)
 Josef Stroh (1965)
 Per-Olof Johansson (1966–67)
 Stig Sundqvist (1968–71)
 Jan Karlsson (1972)
 Stig Sundqvist (1973)
 Ingvar Svensson (1974–76)
 Max Möller (1977)
 Bo Axberg (1978–80)
 Weine Wallinder (1981)
 Sonny Nordqvist (1981–83)
 Roger Johansson (1984–85)
 Sven Andersson (1986)
 Max Möller (1987–88)
 Bo Axberg (1989–91)
 Sonny Nordqvist (1992)
 Bo Andersson (1992–93)
 Ola Henriksson (1993–94)
 Jan Karlsson (1995)
 Jörgen Augustsson (1996)
 Sonny Nordqvist (1997)
 Giles Stille (1998–99)
 Per-Åke Knutsson (2000–01)
 Peter Churchill (2002)
 Thomas Ek (2002)
 Olle Nordin (2003–07)
 Thomas Ek (2008)
 Olle Nordin (2008–09)
 Andreas Jankevics (2010)
 Hans Lindbom (2010–11)
 Mats Gren (2012–13)
 Jimmy Thelin (2014–17)
 Jörgen Wålemark (2018)
 Stefan Jörgensen (2018)
 Andreas Brännström (2018–2020)
 Patric Jildefalk (2021-2022)
 Oscar Garcia Rodriguez (2022)
 Niclas Tagesson (2022)
 Andrés García (2023-)

Season to season

Attendances

In recent seasons Jönköpings Södra have had the following average attendances:

Honours
Allsvenskan
Runners-up: 1949–50
Superettan
Winners: 2015

Footnotes

References

External links

 
 Green Machine – supporter club
 Stadsparksvallen – supporter site
 Södrasajten.se- Supporter site

 
Football clubs in Jönköping County
Allsvenskan clubs
Association football clubs established in 1922
1922 establishments in Sweden
Sport in Jönköping